The canton of Château-Landon is a French former administrative division, located in the arrondissement of Fontainebleau, in the Seine-et-Marne département (Île-de-France région). It was disbanded following the French canton reorganisation which came into effect in March 2015. It consisted of 15 communes, which joined the canton of Nemours in 2015.

Demographics

Composition 
The canton of Château-Landon was composed of 15 communes:

Arville
Aufferville
Beaumont-du-Gâtinais
Bougligny
Bransles
Chaintreaux
Château-Landon
Chenou
Gironville
Ichy
La Madeleine-sur-Loing
Maisoncelles-en-Gâtinais
Mondreville
Obsonville
Souppes-sur-Loing

See also
 Cantons of the Seine-et-Marne department
 Communes of the Seine-et-Marne department

References

Chateau-Landon
2015 disestablishments in France
States and territories disestablished in 2015